Aris Ambríz (born December 18, 1985) is an American professional boxer.

Amateur career
In 2005 Ambríz fought at the National Golden Gloves Championships in the Light Welterweight division.

Professional career
On February 28, 2011, Ambríz upset title contender Héctor Serrano, they fought at the Orange County Fairgrounds in Costa Mesa, California.

In his next fight Aris lost an undefeated Pier Olivier Cote, this bout was on Showtime's televised portion of the Pacquiao vs. Mosley undercard.

References

External links

American boxers of Mexican descent
Welterweight boxers
1985 births
Living people
American male boxers
People from Azusa, California